Holden is an unorganized territory in Adams County, North Dakota, United States. As of the 2010 census it had a population of 21.
Holden comprises the territory of former Holden Township, which was dissolved following the 1990 census.

References

Populated places in Adams County, North Dakota